Bronisław Bohatyrewicz of Ostoja (1870–1940) was a Polish military commander and a general of the Polish Army. Murdered during the Katyn massacre, Bohatyrewicz was one of the Generals whose bodies were identified by forensic scientists of the Katyn Commission during the 1943 exhumation.

Life

Born 24 February or 24 April 1870 (sources differ) in Grodno, in a noble family being part of the Clan of Ostoja, Bohatyrewicz joined the Imperial Russian Army, where he received officers training. In September 1918 he joined the Polish Army. He started as the commanding officer of Belarusian self-defence units in Grodno during the opening stages of the Russian Civil War and then the Polish-Bolshevik War. Successful in the battle of Grodno, in 1919 he became the commander of the Polish 81st Infantry Regiment. After the war he continued his career in the army and received further training in the Higher War School in Warsaw. Between 1923 and 1926 he commanded the infantry units of the Polish 18th Infantry Division and the following year he was promoted to the rank of generał brygady and retired from active duty.

Katyn
After the Polish Defensive War of 1939 Bohatyrewicz was arrested by the NKVD and imprisoned in Kozelsk in the Soviet Union. He was murdered in Katyn in the spring of 1940, aged seventy, during the Katyń massacre.  Among the Katyn victims were 14 Polish generals including Leon Billewicz, Xawery Czernicki (admiral), Stanisław Haller, Aleksander Kowalewski, Henryk Minkiewicz, Kazimierz Orlik-Łukoski, Konstanty Plisowski, Rudolf Prich (murdered in Lviv), Franciszek Sikorski, Leonard Skierski, Piotr Skuratowicz, Mieczysław Smorawiński and Alojzy Wir-Konas (promoted posthumously).

Honours and awards
 Silver Cross of the Order of Virtuti Militari
 Cross of Valour - four times
 Silver Cross of Merit
 Merit Cross for Forces in Central Lithuanian

See also
 Katyn
 Clan of Ostoja
 Ostoja coat of arms
 Mieczysław Smorawiński

References

1870 births
1940 deaths
People from Grodno
People from Grodnensky Uyezd
Clan of Ostoja
Polish generals
Polish military personnel killed in World War II
Polish prisoners of war
World War II prisoners of war held by the Soviet Union
Recipients of the Silver Cross of the Virtuti Militari
Recipients of the Cross of Valour (Poland)
Recipients of the Silver Cross of Merit (Poland)
People from the Russian Empire of Polish descent
Imperial Russian Army personnel
Belarusian people executed by the Soviet Union
Katyn massacre victims